Polo Ground, Karachi, also known as Gulshan-e-Jinnah or Bagh-i-Quaid-i-Azam, is a park located on Dr. Ziauddin Ahmed Road and Aiwan-e-Sadar Road in Karachi, Sindh, Pakistan. This park is spread over 20 acres and has a football ground, Japanese garden, children's recreation area, bird aviary, and jogging tracks. A baradari is also located there. It also has two five-star hotels nearby. The ground also hosts the biggest Eid congregation in Karachi.

Although the ground is officially known as Bagh-i-Quaid-i-Azam, the former name 'Polo Ground' is still widely used by the people of Karachi.

History
Bagh-e-Quaid-e-Azam has historic significance. It was the venue of the first official march-past of the military parade in front of Pakistani political leaders after independence of Pakistan in 1947. This parade was held here and Quaid-e-Azam Muhammad Ali Jinnah took the salute here as the first Governor General of Pakistan in 1947.

The first Eid prayers were organized by the Karachi Metropolitan Corporation at the ground in 1958.

The ground sees a multitude of tape ball cricket matches being simultaneously being played in it. It is said that Hanif Mohammad and his four brothers learned the game there in the 1940s and early 1950s. This park was used as a polo ground before the 1970s.

On 26 March 2022, Administrator Karachi Murtaza Wahab inaugurated a bird aviary at the ground. The 100-foot-long and 45-foot-wide enclosure houses 315 birds, including three pairs of African and Australian parrots.

References

Parks in Karachi
Gardens in Pakistan
Memorials to Muhammad Ali Jinnah
Eidgahs